Victoria Marguerite Treadell,  (born 4 November 1959) is the high commissioner of the United Kingdom to Australia and has been in the posting since April 2019. She is the former High Commissioner of the United Kingdom to Malaysia, High Commissioner of the United Kingdom to New Zealand and Samoa, and Governor of the Pitcairn Islands.

Early life and education

She was born on 4 November 1959 in Ipoh, Perak, Malaya (now Malaysia) to a Cantonese mother and a father of French-Dutch ancestry.

Diplomatic career

Treadell joined the Foreign and Commonwealth Office in 1978. Before her posting to New Zealand, she had held postings in Pakistan, India and Malaysia.

From 2010 to 2014, she served as High Commissioner to New Zealand and Governor of Pitcairn. She is the first woman who served as British High Commissioner to New Zealand. From October 2014 to 2019, she served as High Commissioner to Malaysia.

On 12 February 2019, Treadell was announced as the next British High Commissioner to Australia, in succession to Menna Rawlings, taking up the post in March 2019.

In early February 2020, Treadell took the "unprecedented" step of giving two elected officials from the Parliament of Australia a "dressing down". The letter, showed "stern" disapproval for how Australia had revealed its security concerns over the UK's invitation to Huawei into its 5G network, which had been expressed both to her, and her Foreign Secretary Dominic Raab, in a private briefing.

In 2021, she was branded as a "sanctimonious bore" by senior members of the Australian government over "publicly lecturing" Australia on its allegedly inadequate efforts to combat climate change.

Personal life

In 1985, the then Victoria Jansz married Alan Treadell.

In addition, due to her interest in culture and arts, she has been one of the patrons of the Singapore-based British Theatre Playhouse since 2014, with regard to the plays that are produced in Malaysia.

Honours

She was appointed a Member of the Royal Victorian Order (MVO) in 1989 following a visit by Elizabeth II to Malaysia. In the 2010 Queen's Birthday Honours, she was made a Companion of the Order of St Michael and St George (CMG).

References

1959 births
Living people
People from Ipoh
British people of Chinese descent
British people of Dutch descent
British people of French descent
Governors of Pitcairn
High Commissioners of the United Kingdom to Australia
High Commissioners of the United Kingdom to New Zealand
High Commissioners of the United Kingdom to Samoa
High Commissioners of the United Kingdom to Malaysia
British women ambassadors
20th-century British diplomats
21st-century British diplomats